The 2020 European Individual Speedway Junior Championship (also known as the 2020 Speedway European Under 21 Championship) was the 23rd edition of the Championship. It was the last U21 final because from 2021 the age limit was changed to U19 which would become the sole Junior championship. 

The U21 final was staged at Gdańsk in Poland and was won by Wiktor Lampart of Poland.

The U19 final was staged at Žarnovica in Slovakia and was won by Jan Kvěch of the Czech Republic for the second successive year.

Under 21

Final
 9 October 2020
  Gdańsk

Under 19

Final
 16 August 2020
  Žarnovica

See also 
 2020 Speedway European Championship

References

Individual Speedway Junior European Championship
European Junior Championship
2020 in Polish speedway
International sports competitions hosted by Poland